Tasword was a word processor for the ZX Spectrum developed by Tasman Software.  The first version was released in 1982 and spawned two major revisions in addition to several add-ons and, later, tailored versions for the +2 and +3 Spectrum models, the SAM Coupé, the MSX, the Timex Sinclair 2068 and the Amstrad CPC range.

Many of the features of modern word processors were included, such as justification, word wrap and page header. Features such as bold text and italic type were achieved through sending special escape sequences to a printer.

It featured the ability to use a 64 characters per line font in the standard ZX Spectrum screen.

Add-on products included TasMerge for mail merge functionality (which was later included in Tasword III and later versions) and TasSpell for spell checker.

Releases

ZX81
Tasword - 1982

ZX Spectrum
Tasword Two "The Word Processor" - 1983 
Tasword Three "The Word Processor"  - 1986

Timex Sinclair 2068
Tasword Two - 1983

ZX Spectrum 128
Tasword 128 "The Word Processor for the Spectrum 128" - 1986
Tasword +2A -	1991

ZX Spectrum +3
Tasword +3 - 1987

Sam Coupe
Tasword II - 1990

Commodore 64
Tasword 64  "The Word Processor" - 1985 (80 column)

MSX
Tasword MSX "The Word Processor" - 1984
Tasword MSX-2 - 1986

Amstrad CPC
Tasword 464 "The Word Processor" - 1984 
Tasword 6128 "The Word Processor" - 1985

Amstrad PCW
Tasword 8000 - 1986

Tatung Einstein
Tasword Einstein "The Word Processor" - 1985

IBM PC compatible
Tasword PC "The Word Processor" - 1986
Tasres PC (special Terminate and stay resident version) - 1988
Tasword 2 PC - 1990 (named TWIX in the Netherlands)

References

External links

Word processors
ZX Spectrum software